Dangerous Paths is a 1921 American silent drama film directed by Duke Worne and starring Neva Gerber, Ben F. Wilson and Edith Stayart.

Cast
 Neva Gerber as Ruth Hammond
 Ben F. Wilson as John Emerson 
 Edith Stayart as Violet Benson
 Joseph W. Girard as Silas Newton
 Henry Van Sickle as Noah Hammond
 Helen Gilmore as Deborah Hammond

References

Bibliography
 Munden, Kenneth White. The American Film Institute Catalog of Motion Pictures Produced in the United States, Part 1. University of California Press, 1997.

External links
 

1921 films
1921 drama films
1920s English-language films
American silent feature films
Silent American drama films
Films directed by Duke Worne
Arrow Film Corporation films
1920s American films